FC Chavdar (ФК Чавдар Бяла Слатина) was a Bulgarian football club from the town of Byala Slatina.

Honours
 Quarterfinalist - 5th in National Championship.
 Third place in North "B" Group: 1957 and 1958.
 Eightfinalist in Bulgarian Cup: 1994-95.
 Champion of Northwestern "V" AFG: 1990-91, 2005–06 and 2009–10

Football clubs in Bulgaria
1957 establishments in Bulgaria